Vassy-sous-Pisy (literally Vassy under Pisy; before 2010: Vassy) is a commune in the Yonne department in Bourgogne-Franche-Comté in north-central France.

Geography
The town is built on the summit of a 310 m high conical hill or monticule.

History
The ancient route from Paris to Lyon passed through Vassy, and in the 13th century we find a mention of the town, under the name of Vasseium.  In 1786 investigations were made into the possibility of coal mining here.  In the 19th century the town gained a train station on the Auxerre-Avallon line, thanks to the factory of Honoré Gariel.  He and his brother Hippolyte had created a company or Société able to produce hydraulic lime.  " A depot was founded in Paris; the cement, named from then on Ciment romain de Vassy, was employed by considerable businesses, and made the Société's fortune, though Honoré Gariel had by then ceased to take a part in the Société."
A modest hamlet previously dependent on Étaule, Vassy would thus become — with an influx of blue-collar workers — a commune in its own right.

The hamlet surpassed the town's administrative center:  The Gariel family endowed a town girls school (directed by the soeurs de la Providence, or sisters of Providence) with a chapel and a presbytery.  As the population uniformly increased, a new church was begun in 1859 and finished in 1862.

Mayors

See also
Communes of the Yonne department

References

Communes of Yonne